Frank Duffy (born January 22, 1937) is an American equestrian. He competed in two events at the 1956 Summer Olympics.  He earned degrees from the University of Michigan and Harvard Medical School.

References

1937 births
Living people
American male equestrians
Olympic equestrians of the United States
Equestrians at the 1956 Summer Olympics
Sportspeople from Honolulu
University of Michigan alumni
Harvard Medical School alumni